Ada Kramm (née Egede-Nissen, 14 March 1899 – 17 December 1981) was a Norwegian stage and film actress whose career spanned more than six decades.

Early life and career
Born Ada Egede-Nissen in Vardø, Finnmark, Norway, her parents were the Norwegian politician Adam Egede-Nissen (1868–1952) and Georga ("Goggi") Wilhelma Ellertsen (1871–1959). She had ten siblings; six of her siblings, Aud Egede-Nissen (1893–1974), Gerd Grieg (1895–1988), Oscar Egede-Nissen (1903–1976), Stig Egede-Nissen (1907–1988), Lill Egede-Nissen (1909–1962) and Gøril Havrevold (1914–1992), all became stage and film actors. When she was eleven years old, the family moved to Stavanger, where she began studying at the Stavanger Faste Scene (Stavanger Fixed Scene) theatre. She made her stage début in 1916 in Selma Lagerlöf's Dunungen.

In 1917, Kramm accompanied her two older sisters Aud and Gerd to Berlin, Germany where the three young women opened a small film production and distribution company called the Egede-Nissen Film Company The trio used the studio to promote themselves in film roles directed by George Alexander from 1917 until 1920. Kramm appeared in a number of crime serials as the character Ada van Ehler beginning in 1917. In 1920 she married German violinist Hugo Kramm and began using her married name as a professional moniker and the young newly-weds returned to Norway. They later had a daughter together, actress Ilse Kramm (born 1934).

From 1921 until 1924 Kramm appeared at the Bergen and Den Nationale Scene. After her husband joined the Oslo Philharmonic Orchestra in 1924 they moved to Oslo and she worked at Det Nye Teater (The New Theatre) from 1925 until 1928, the Centralteatret (Central Theatre) from 1928 to 1934 and later at the Nationaltheatret (National Theatre). She also returned to film, and appeared in roles in the 1928 Norwegian-German coproduction of Schneeschuhbanditen opposite her sister Aud Egede-Nissen and Austrian actor Paul Richter and 1930's Eskimo opposite Mona Mårtenson and again with Paul Richter.

Later career and death
Kramm spent the next several decades on Norwegian stages in productions by Henrik Ibsen, August Strindberg, Tennessee Williams and Arthur Miller. At age 72 she appeared in the role of Aunt Julie in Hedda Gabler on a tour of Japan. After over six decades on stage, she went into semi-retirement and occasionally made appearances on Norwegian television. Her last role before her death was in the 1979 Anja Breien-directed, Palme d'Or nominated dramatic film Arven (Heritage) with Espen Skjønberg, Anita Björk and Jan Hårstad.

She died on 17 December 1981 in Oslo at age eighty-two and was buried in the Vestre gravlund cemetery.

Awards
Teaterkritikerprisen (Norwegian Theatre Critics Award), 1947–1948 for her role as Amanda Wingfield in The Glass Menagerie by Tennessee Williams
King's Medal of Merit in Gold
Order of St. Olav, Knight, First Class, 1977

Filmography

References

External links

Ada Egede-Nissen at Women Film Pioneers Project

1899 births
1981 deaths
People from Vardø
Norwegian stage actresses
Norwegian film actresses
Norwegian silent film actresses
20th-century Norwegian actresses
Recipients of the King's Medal of Merit in gold
Burials at Vestre gravlund
Women film pioneers